Stadsvandringar ("City Walks") is the CD version of the Swedish psychedelic rock group Dungen's second album.

It was originally released by Subliminal Sounds in 2002 in a limited vinyl edition of 500 copies under the name Dungen 2. The CD version was released that year on Dolores Recordings and contained some alternative tracks. The album was re-issued by Astralwerks in 2005 for US distribution.

Track listing
"Stadsvandringar" (City Walks) - 3:17
"Har du vart' i Stockholm?" (Have You Been to Stockholm?) - 3:43
"Solen stiger upp Del 1 & Del 2" (The Sun Rises Part 1 & Part 2) - 4:06
"Stock och sten" (Logs and Stones) - 3:28
"Sol och regn" (Sun and Rain) - 4:23
"Fest" (Party) - 3:37
"Natten blir dag" (The Night Becomes Day) - 3:07
"Andra sidan sjön" (The Other Side of the Lake) - 4:06
"Stadsvandring Del 2" (City Walk Part 2) - 0:34
"Vem vaktar lejonen?" (Who Guards the Lions?) - 3:39
"Krona" (Crown) - 4:01

References

2002 albums